Tom's Bar is a popular gay bar in the Schöneberg locality of Berlin, Germany.

Description
Tom's Bar is a popular gay bar in Berlin's Schöneberg locality that attracts locals and international visitors year-round. Once exclusively a leather bar, Tom's now has a less restrictive dress code, though patrons still wear leather and skin clothing often. The bar has been described as a "dark, sweaty and debauched men-only cruising establishment" with a "rough, manly atmosphere". Its slogan is "for successful cruising". Tom's features a dark room and its main bar area streams videos and includes a football table. It is open daily from 10pm to "late".

Reception
According to Berlin Tourismus and Kongress GmbH, the bar's slogan "puts it in a nutshell, and it's no exaggeration... People of all ages and from all walks of life get together here, especially when the night is getting on." Similarly, Tom's was called a "great place to finish off an evening" in The Rough Guide to Germany (2009). In Top 10 Berlin (2014), Juergen Scheunemann included Tom's Bar as number five on a list of the best gay and lesbian attractions in the city. Scheunemann called the bar a "traditional pub" and a "well-known pick-up joint ... not for those who are shy and timid".

See also

 Easter in Berlin, Berlin's annual leather and fetish event
 Folsom Europe, Berlin's annual BDSM and leather street festival
 LGBT culture in Berlin

References

External links
 

Leather bars and clubs
LGBT culture in Germany
LGBT nightclubs
Nightclubs in Berlin